The 24th Filmfare Awards South ceremony honoring the winners of the best of South Indian cinema in 1976 was an event held on August 14, 1977, at Kalaivanar Arangam in Madras.

The president of this year's function was the Governor of Andhra Pradesh Mrs. Sharda Mukherjee. The chief guest of the evening was President of the South Indian Film Chamber of Commerce Mr. D. V. S. Raju.

Awards

Kannada cinema

Malayalam cinema

Tamil cinema

Telugu cinema

Special Awards

Awards presentation

 K. G. George (Special Award) Received Award from Vidhubala
 Jayapradha (Special Award) Received Award from Zarina Wahab
 Gummadi (Special Award) Received Award from Raja Sulochana
 Prem Nazir (Special Award) Received Award from Sheela
 K. N. Subbiah (Best Film Kannada) Received Award from Ramakrishna
 G. V. Iyer (Best Director Kannada) Received Award from S. R. Puttanna Kanagal
 Jayanthi (Best Actress Kannada) Received Award from Krishnam Raju
 Srinath (Best Actor Kannada)Received Award from Thikkurissy Sukumaran Nair
 Mrs. Raji Thampi (Best Film Malayalam) Received Award from Vijayakumar
 Sreekumaran Thampi (Best Director Malayalam) Received Award from Sowcar Janaki
 Lakshmi (Best Actress Malayalam) Received Award from D. V. S. Raju
 Madhu (Best Actor Malayalam) Received Award from Jayalakshmi
 D. Rama Naidu (Best Film Telugu) Received Award from Vidya Sinha
 Bapu (Best Director Telugu) Received Award from Jayachitra
 Jayasudha (Best Actress Telugu) Received Award from B. R. Chopra
 Sobhan Babu (Best Actor Telugu) Received Award from Sharada Mukherjee
 S. K. Subbu (Best Film Tamil) Received Award from Nirmala
 S. P. Muthuraman (Best Director Tamil) Received Award from Manjula
 Sujatha (Best Actress Tamil) Received Award from Amol Palekar
 Kamal Haasan (Best Actor Tamil) Received Award from Gemini Ganesan

References

 Filmfare Magazine September 16–29, 1977.

General

External links
 
 

Filmfare Awards South